Long Common is a village in the civil parish of Botley in the Eastleigh district of Hampshire, England. It lies approximately 5.6 miles (9.0 km) north-east from Southampton.

Villages in Hampshire